Bayles was a railway station on the Strzelecki line in South Gippsland, Victoria, Australia. The station was opened on 29 June 1922. Bayles was the final station to remain open the entire life of the Strzelecki line, It was the terminus of the line from 15 April 1950 when the line was truncated from Yannathan. The short section of track was kept open mostly to serve the local butter factory. In 1972, the Bayles Fauna Park was opened on the former site of the station and goods yard.

Station facilities
Upon opening of the line in 1922 Bayles station was supplied with sheep yards, goods loading and storage facilities, departmental residence and passenger facilities. Even though Bayles was the terminus of the line for 9 years it was never fitted with a turntable, which required trains to run tender first Down the line.

References

Disused railway stations in Victoria (Australia)